Suchman is a surname. Notable people with the surname include:

Lucy Suchman, British anthropologist
Mark C. Suchman (born 1960), American sociologist

German-language surnames
Jewish surnames